In My Mind may refer to:

Films
 In My Mind (film), a 2017 British documentary by Chris Rodley

Music

Albums 
 In My Mind (BJ the Chicago Kid album), 2016
 In My Mind (Heather Headley album), 2006
 In My Mind (Pharrell Williams album), 2006
 In My Mind 1997–2007 the Best of Bertine Zetlitz, 2007
 In My Mind (Is a Different World – A Cheeky One), a 2007 album by The Cheeky Girls

Songs 
 "In My Mind" (Antiloop song), 1997
 "In My Mind" (Heather Headley song), 2005
 "In My Mind" (Maty Noyes song), 2016
 "In My Mind" (Ivan Gough and Feenixpawl song); covered by:
 Axwell, 2012
 Dynoro and Gigi D'Agostino, 2018
 "In My Mind", a song by Amanda Palmer from the 2011 album Amanda Palmer Goes Down Under
 "In My Mind", a song by Walk the Moon from the 2017 album What If Nothing

See also
 My Mind (disambiguation)
 On My Mind (disambiguation)